Neena (born 2 October 1981, in Chennai) is an Indian actress who has appeared in the Tamil film industry. Beginning her career as a child artiste, the actress won critical acclaim for her performance in Vidukathai (1997) and later appeared in other Tamil films.

Career
After making a debut as the younger version of Anju's character in Vasanth's Keladi Kanmani (1990), Neena appeared in Selva's serial drama, Neela Mala. Despite garnering offers to star in films, Neena refused several chances to appear in leading roles, before signing on to star in K. Balachandar's production Vidukathai (1997) directed by Agathiyan. Her performance in the film won critical acclaim upon release, with a reviewer noting her "acting is excellent" and that she "brings out every aspect of the character she is playing, especially the clear-cut deliveries of her dialogues emphasizing the inner strength of the character". After a few more film roles, she returned to prioritise television roles, appearing in dramas such as Chithi. In 2004 she got married and settled in Melbourne, Australia. She has 2 children Sonia and Sanjay.

Filmography

Television

References

Living people
Actresses in Tamil cinema
Actresses from Chennai
1981 births
Actresses in Telugu cinema
Indian film actresses
20th-century Indian actresses
Actresses in Tamil television